The Lady and the Mob is a 1939 American crime film directed by Benjamin Stoloff and written by Richard Maibaum and Gertrude Purcell. The film stars Fay Bainter, Ida Lupino, Lee Bowman, Henry Armetta, Warren Hymer and Harold Huber. It was released on April 3, 1939 by Columbia Pictures.

Plot

Cast        
Fay Bainter as Hattie Leonard
Ida Lupino as Lila Thorne
Lee Bowman as Fred Leonard
Henry Armetta as Zambrogio
Warren Hymer as Frankie O'Fallon
Harold Huber as Harry the Lug
Forbes Murray as District Attorney
Joe Sawyer as Blinky Mack 
Tom Dugan as Brains Logan
Joe Caits as Bert the Beetle
Jim Toney as Big Time Tim
Tommy Mack as The Canary
Brandon Tynan as Mayor Jones
George Meeker as George Watson

References

External links
 

1939 films
American crime films
1939 crime films
Columbia Pictures films
Films directed by Benjamin Stoloff
American black-and-white films
Films with screenplays by Richard Maibaum
1930s English-language films
1930s American films